The 2002 National Football League expansion draft is the most recent National Football League (NFL) draft in which a new expansion team, named the Houston Texans, selected its first players.  On October 6, 1999, in Atlanta, NFL owners had unanimously voted to award the 32nd NFL franchise and Super Bowl XXXVIII to the city of Houston, Texas.  In order for the Texans to become competitive with existing teams, the league awarded them the first pick in the 2002 NFL Draft and gave them the opportunity to select current players from existing teams.  That selection was provided by the expansion draft, held on February 18, 2002.

In this draft, held months before the regular draft, the existing franchises listed players from which the Texans could select to switch to the new team.  This was the third expansion draft after the NFL had instituted the salary cap, which limited the total amount teams could spend on their roster of players.  Teams placed many quality players on the list who had large contracts, as the Texans were required to assume the contracts of those players if selected. The list included 155 NFL players, 25 of whom were Pro Bowl players.  The draft took place live and aired on ESPN. The Texans drafted a total of 19 players. They selected three players with a total salary-cap value of $14.9 million from the Jacksonville Jaguars, who were $23 million over the cap; three players with a total salary-cap value of $14.1 million from the New York Jets, who were $16 million over the cap; and two players with a total salary-cap value of $7.1 million from the Baltimore Ravens, who were $23 million over the cap.

Rules of the draft

Process
Each NFL team listed five players that the Texans could select, and the Texans were required to claim either 30 players or $27.2 million in contracts (38% of the 2002 salary cap).  After the Texans selected a player from an existing team, that team could remove a player from their remaining list.  If a second player was taken, the existing team could then pull back its remaining players.  However, teams were not required to remove players from the draftable list, resulting in three Jets and three Jaguars being drafted to the Texans. The Texans were prohibited from selecting a player from a team and trading the player back to that club.

Player limitations
Existing teams were not allowed to put punters or kickers on the list, nor any player from their 2001 roster who would have become an unrestricted free agent in 2002. They could not list players who went on injured reserve during the 2001 summer's training camp nor any player who would become a restricted free agent after the 2001 season.  Their list could include only one player with more than 10 years' experience.

Salary cap ramifications
Teams welcomed the expansion draft as a way to eliminate expensive veteran players from their salary caps, because the Texans assumed the contracts of the players they selected, including all future portions of their signing bonuses and any guarantees or other terms. Notable players that teams exposed to the draft included five-time Pro Bowler Tony Boselli, Randall McDaniel, and Willie Roaf. The Jets left Aaron Glenn unprotected although it wanted to keep him, because the team hoped that the Texans would not want Glenn's $8 million salary-cap figure for 2002.

If the Texans cut a selection and he re-signed with his old team, the existing team re-assumed his signing bonus. Extra bonuses that did not count against the Texans' salary cap were given to veteran players who were selected. Those selected received $10,000 immediately, an additional $20,000 bonus for reporting to training camp, and another $30,000 for making the active roster during the regular season.

Player selections

References
General
 
 
 

Specific

2002
Expansion Draft
Houston Texans lists
NFL expansion draft
NFL expansion draft
NFL expansion draft
Events in Houston